Attorney General Barnes may refer to:

A. R. Barnes (1867–1944), Attorney General of Utah
Clarence A. Barnes (1882–1970), Attorney General of Massachusetts

See also
General Barnes (disambiguation)